This list of synagogues and Jewish congregations in Australia and New Zealand represents those known to have existed at some time in the history of Jewish communities in either the colonial or national periods of either countries.

Although many established congregations choose to build synagogues, Jewish congregations may also use existing, often residential, premises. In these cases only the interior is changed, leaving the exterior in its original design.

Australia

New South Wales and Australian Capital Territory 
 Adath Yisroel Congregation, Bondi, NSW
 Bina, Bondi, NSW
 Bet Yosef (Caro), Bondi, NSW
 Central Coast Shalom Progressive, Tumbi Umbi, NSW
 Central Synagogue, Sydney, (Orach Chayyim) Bondi Junction, NSW
 Chabad Byron Bay, NSW
 Chabad Double Bay, Double Bay, NSW
 Chabad House of Bondi Beach/Friends of Refugees of Eastern Europe (FREE), Bondi Beach, NSW
 Chabad House of the North Shore, St Ives, NSW
 Chabad House for (Israeli) Tourists, Bondi, NSW
 Chabad Shtieble, Bondi Junction, NSW
 Coogee Synagogue, Coogee, NSW
 Cremorne and District Hebrew Congregation (Sha’arei Tzedek), Neutral Bay, NSW
 Dover Heights Shule, Dover Heights, NSW
 Emanuel Synagogue (Progressive, Masorti and Renewal), Woollahra, NSW
 The Great Synagogue (Bet Yisrael) Sydney, NSW
 Jewish Learning Centre, Bondi, NSW
 Kadimah, Central Coast, NSW
 Kehillat Kadimah, Rose Bay, NSW
 Kehillat Masada, St Ives, NSW
 Kehillat Moriah, Queens Park, NSW
 Maroubra Synagogue, Maroubra, NSW
 Mizrachi Synagogue Bondi, North Bondi, NSW
 National Jewish Memorial Centre – Canberra and Region Jewish Community, Manuka, ACT (Progressive and Orthodox services)
 Nefesh/Roscoe Street Synagogue, Bondi Beach, NSW
 Newcastle Hebrew Congregation (Bet Yisra’el), Newcastle, NSW
 Newtown Synagogue (Mikveh Yisra’el), Newtown, NSW
 North Shore Synagogue (The Garden Synagogue), (Tzedek Ve'Emet) Lindfield, New South Wales
 North Shore Temple Emanuel, Chatswood, NSW
 Or Chadash, Bondi, NSW
 Parramatta Synagogue, Parramatta, NSW
 Rainbow Kehilah, Byron Bay, NSW
 Sephardi Synagogue, Woollahra, NSW
 Southern Sydney Synagogue - formerly Illawarra Hebrew Congregation, Allawah, NSW
 Tzemach Tzedek Community Centre, Bondi, NSW
 Yeshiva Centre Synagogue, Bondi NSW
 Young Adult Chabad, Bondi, NSW

Inactive
 Baba Sali, Dover Heights, NSW from 1994 to 2003
 Bankstown [War Memorial?] Synagogue. Destroyed by fire 1991.
 Broken Hill Synagogue, NSW 1910 to 1962
 Forbes Synagogue, a small timber building during the 1860s gold rush, possibly burnt or washed away in a flood.
 Goulburn synagogue, Goulburn, NSW, 1824 to late 19th century. Property was granted but Synagogue was not built.
 Harambam Synagogue (Sephardi), Bondi, NSW (no longer functional)
 Kensington Shul, Redfern and then in Kensington, NSW, 2000? to 2012
 Maitland Synagogue, Maitland, NSW 1830 onwards. Substantial synagogue erected 1879, closed in 1898
 Macquarie Street Synagogue (Sukkat David), Sydney, NSW, to 1877
 Ryde and Districts Synagogue, (Beth Eliyahu) North Ryde, NSW
 Shtiebell, Bellevue Hill, NSW (part of Bina) (until 2010)
 South Head Synagogue, Rose Bay, NSW
 Strathfield and District Hebrew Congregation, Strathfield, NSW (http://strathfieldschule.weebly.com/)
 York Street Synagogue, Sydney, NSW, 1844 to 1877

Queensland 

 Beit Or v'Shalom Inc - Progressive Jewish Synagogue - Carina, Brisbane, Qld
 Chabad House of Brisbane, Carindale, Brisbane, Qld
 Givat Tziyyon - South Brisbane Hebrew Orthodox Congregation, Greenslopes, Brisbane, Qld
 Sha’arei Emunah - Brisbane Hebrew Congregation, Brisbane, Qld
 Bet Shlomo - The Gold Coast Hebrew Congregation, Surfers Paradise, Gold Coast, Qld
 Temple Shalom, Isle Of Capri, Gold Coast, Qld

South Australia 

 Chabad of South Australia (1998–present), currently located in Evandale, SA

 Adelaide Hebrew Congregation Inc.(1990–present), 'The Adelaide Synagogue', Glenside, SA
previously Adelaide Hebrew Congregation (1850–1990), Adelaide, SA
 Adelaide Progressive Jewish Congregation Inc., 'Beit Shalom Synagogue' (1976–present), Hackney, SA
initially named 'Temple Shalom' and previously at Prospect, SA (1967-1976)

Tasmania 
 Hobart Synagogue - Hobart Hebrew Congregation
 Launceston Synagogue

Victoria

Conservative
 Kehilat Nitzan Synagogue, (Masorti) Caulfield Junction, Vic

Orthodox
 Adass Israel Congregation, Ripponlea, Vic
 Aish Melbourne Australia, Ripponlea, Vic
 Ark Centre, East Hawthorn, Vic
 Ballarat Hebrew Congregation (She’erit Yisra’el), Ballarat, Vic
 Beis Menachem Community Centre, East Bentleigh, Vic
 Beit Aharon (Arnold Bloch) Memorial Synagogue, East St Kilda, Vic
 Beth Chabad Ohel Devorah, East St Kilda, Vic
 Beth Chabad Yotz’ei Russia (F.R.E.E.), Eat St Kilda, Vic
 Blake Street Hebrew Congregation, South Caulfield, Vic
 B'nai B'rith House, East St Kilda, Vic
 Brighton Hebrew Congregation, East Brighton, Vic
 Caulfield Hebrew Congregation Inc. Synagogue (Kehilla Kedosha Ahavath Shalom), North Caulfield, Vic
 Central Shule Chabad, South Caulfield, Vic
 Chabad Bayside, Congregation Beis Eliyahu, East Brighton, Vic
 Chabad House Carnegie, Carnegie, Vic
 Chabad House of Caulfield, 770, East St Kilda, Vic
 Chabad House East Bentleigh, East Bentleigh, Vic
 Chabad House Glen Eira, Caulfield, Vic
 Chabad House Malvern, Malvern, Vic
 Chabad of Melbourne CBD, Melbourne, Vic
 DaMinyan, East St Kilda, Vic
 East Melbourne Hebrew Congregation (Mikveh Yisra’el), East Melbourne, Vic
 Elsternwick Jewish Community (Etz Chayyim), Elsternwick, Vic
 Elwood Talmud Torah Hebrew Congregation (Bet Avraham), Elwood, Vic
 Friends of Lubavitch, Caulfield North, Vic
 Gerrer Shtiebel, East St Kilda, Vic
 Hamayan, North Caulfield, Vic
 Hamerkaz Shelanu, Elsternwick, Vic
 Heichal HaTorah, Ripponlea, Vic
 Jewish Care, Melbourne, Vic
 Jewish Centre Ormond McKinnon, Ormond, Vic
 Katanga/ Caulfield Beth Hamedrash, North Caulfield, Vic 
 Kew Hebrew Congregation (Bet Nachman), Kew, Vic
 Kolel Menachem Lubavitch, East St Kilda, Vic
 Kollel Beth HaTalmud Yehuda Fishman Institute, Balaclava, Vic
 Melbourne Hebrew Congregation (She’erit Yisra’el), South Yarra, Vic
 Merkaz HaTorah, North Caulfield, Vic
 Merkos L'inyonei Chinuch (Chabad), East St Kilda, Vic
 Mizrachi Synagogue, North Caulfield, Vic comprising:
Beit Haroeh
Beit Yehuda
 Bnei Akiva Melbourne
Haskama minyan
Ohr David-Beit Midrash Naftali Herc
 Moorabbin Hebrew Congregation, Moorabbin, Vic
 North Eastern Jewish War Memorial Centre - Yeshurun Congregation, Doncaster, Vic
 Rabbinical College of Australia and New Zealand (Yeshiva Gedolah), St Kilda East, Victoria
 Ramban Sephardi Congregation, East St Kilda, Vic
 Sassoon Yehuda Sephardi Synagogue, Balaclava, Vic
 Satmer Shil, Ripponlea, Vic
 Sha'arei Tefillah, North Caulfield, Vic
 Shira Hadasha, Caulfield North, Vic
 South Caulfield Hebrew Congregation, South Caulfield, Vic
 Spiritshul, Caulfield North, Vic
 St. Kilda Hebrew Congregation (Ohavei Shalom), St. Kilda, Vic

Progressive
 Bentleigh Progressive Synagogue, Victoria, Vic
 Kehilat David Hamelech (KEDEM), (Progressive) Armadale, Vic
 Leo Baeck Centre for Progressive Judaism, (Progressive) East Kew, Vic
 Temple Beth Israel, (Progressive) St. Kilda, Vic

Inactive
 Sandhurst (now Bendigo) Vic 1872 to approximately 1927
 Brunswick Talmud Torah, Brunswick, Vic 1943 to 1987
 Burwood Hebrew Congregation, Burwood, Vic (until 2010)
 Geelong Synagogue, Geelong, Vic 1861 to ?
 Hamakom, North Caulfield, Vic
 Highlands Hebrew Congregation, Seymour, Vic
 Monash Area Jewish Community, Monash, Vic

Western Australia 
 Beit Midrash of Western Australia - The Dianella Shul, Yokine, Perth, WA
 Chabad of Western Australia, Noranda, Perth, WA
 Perth Hebrew Congregation, Menora, Perth, WA
 Temple David Congregation, Inc., Mt Lawley, Perth, WA
 Kol Sasson Congregation., Menora, Perth, WA
 Perth Kabbalat Shabbat - A musical and egalitarian congregation., Yokine, Perth, WA

Inactive
 Goldfields Hebrew Congregation (1896 to 1899), Coolgardie, WA
 Kalgoorlie Hebrew Congregation (1901 to 1940), Kalgoorlie, WA
 Chabad Torah Foundation, Perth, WA
 Fremantle Synagogue (1902 to 1910), South Terrace, Fremantle WA
 Northern Suburbs Hebrew Congregation, Noranda, Perth, WA

New Zealand

North Island

Auckland 
 Auckland Hebrew Congregation (Beth Israel), (Orthodox)
 Synagogue and Community Centre, 108 Greys Avenue
 Former synagogue (1885 to 1967) - building now occupied by the University of Auckland and called University House
 Chabad Auckland New Zealand (Chabad Synagogue)
 Temple Beth Shalom, (Progressive) Auckland
 Raye Freedman Library,
(Jewish library and community centre)
788 Remuera Rd. Remuera,
Auckland

Hamilton
 Waikato Jewish Association

Wellington
 Wellington Jewish Community Centre (incorporating the Beth El Synagogue of the former Wellington Hebrew Congregation), (Orthodox) Wellington
 Temple Sinai - Wellington Progressive Jewish Congregation, Wellington

South Island 
 Canterbury Hebrew Congregation, 406 Durham Street North, Christchurch Central, Christchurch 8013 (Orthodox and Progressive Shabbat services every Friday at 6.30pm and 1030am on Saturday) Christchurch
 Chabad of Otago, (Orthodox) Queenstown
 Dunedin Jewish Congregation, (Progressive) Dunedin
 Dunedin Synagogue, Dunedin (1880 to 1966) - the southernmost synagogue in the world and a listed historic building.

References

 
 
Syn
Syn
Australia